Hà is a Vietnamese surname. The name is transliterated as He in Chinese and Ha in Korean. 

Ha is the anglicized variation of the surname Hà. It is also the anglicized variation of Hạ.

Notable people with the surname Hà
Hà Kiều Anh, Miss Vietnam in 1992
 Hà Huy Tập, General Secretary of Communist Party of Vietnam
 Hà Văn Lâu, diplomatist
 Hà Anh Tuấn, singer
 Hà Nguyễn William, Associate professor of endodontics and app developer

See also 
Kim Hà, main character in Thanhha Lai book Inside Out & Back Again

Vietnamese-language surnames